Sarina Russo is the founder of The Sarina Russo Group.

Early life
Russo migrated to Australia from Sicily with her family in 1956, and attended St Stephen's Primary School and All Hallows' School.

Career
She worked as a legal secretary and as a part-time typing teacher. Russo launched "The Office Business Academy" in 1979.

In recognition of sustained, outstanding entrepreneurial achievement, Ernst & Young recognised Russo as their "2018 Champion of Entrepreneurship" (Northern Region).

As at 2018, Sarina Russo Job Access operates across more than 200 sites, employs more than 1000 people and helped elevate Russo to the 12th spot on the BRW Women’s Rich List in 2015.

The Sarina Russo Group is made up of: Sarina Russo Job Access Australia; Sarina Russo Recruitment; Sarina Russo Apprenticeships; VOICE Psychologists and Allied Professionals, Sarina Russo Institute, Russo Business School, James Cook University Brisbane, Sarina Russo White House, Sarina Russo Global Initiative (not-for-profit arm) and Sarina Investments.

Russo is a member of the Clinton Global Initiative, Queensland Premier’s Annastacia Palaszczuk's Advisory Board, Women’s Leadership Board of the John F. Kennedy School of Government, the Leading Women Entrepreneurs of the World, and a former Trustee of the Jupiter’s Casino Community Benefit Fund since 1995.

Russo is financial contributor to both major Australian political parties, but gives over twice as much to the Liberal Party as to Labor.

References

Living people
Italian emigrants to Australia
Australian women company founders
Australian company founders
People educated at All Hallows' School
Year of birth missing (living people)